Concept-Oriented Reading Instruction (CORI) was developed in 1993 by Dr. John T. Guthrie with a team of elementary teachers and graduate students. The project designed and implemented a framework of conceptually oriented reading instruction to improve students' amount and breadth of reading, intrinsic motivations for reading, and strategies of search and comprehension. The framework emphasized five phases of reading instruction in a content domain: observing and personalizing, searching and retrieving, comprehending and integrating, communicating to others, and interacting with peers to construct meaning. CORI instruction was contrasted to experience-based teaching and strategy instruction in terms of its support for motivational and cognitive development.

History

CORI's aims are to support:

Reading Comprehension via activating background knowledge, questioning, summarizing, searching, organizing graphically, and interpreting stories
Science Inquiry via observation, using knowledge, questioning, designing investigations, collecting data, drawing conclusions, and explaining results conceptually. The science theme was the survival concepts (ecology) of feeding, locomotion, defense, predation, respiration, reproduction, competition, communication, and adjustment to habitat. 
Motivation via knowledge goals for reading, hands-on experiences, interesting books, choices about learning, and collaboration with classmates
Reading and Science Integration via relating observations in hands-on science activities to contents and characters in literary and information books and connecting students' interests in the environment to their motivations for book reading
Student Writing via writing entries in portfolios that demonstrated the following: information text reading, literary text reading, science concepts, science processes, and motivation for reading.

“For nearly 20 years, Guthrie and colleagues have been refining CORI, a program designed to promote a number of literacy goals through the use of broad interdisciplinary themes, primarily drawn from science curricula, such as exploring the impact of humans on animal habitats. CORI provides explicit instruction in reading strategies, such a questioning, activating background knowledge, searching for information, summarizing, and synthesizing information in order to communicate with others. Instruction involves hands-on investigations, inquiry with text, strategy instruction, working in collaborative inquiry teams, and writing to publish and present findings. CORI has been shown to increase students’ science inquiry strategies, and overall text comprehension compared to control classrooms with separate science and literacy curricula and/or strategy instruction in reading alone. Of particular interest in the CORI research is the pivotal role that motivation, in all of its instantiations (interest, self-efficacy, and achievement motivation), plays in learning both science and literacy.” 

CORI investigated the motivations, cognitive competencies, and instructional support needed to increase reading comprehension and engagement of middle school students in science concepts (ecology) and social studies (U.S. Civil War) through the Reading Engagement for Adolescent Learning (REAL) Project. Reading comprehension strategies included: activating background knowledge, questioning, summarizing, inferencing, and concept mapping. Intrinsic motivations included involvement, challenge, curiosity, social interactions, and the teaching of concepts and inquiry skills. Books, educational videos, websites, and other supplemental materials were used to aid students’ learning and teachers’ instruction.

The CORI program equipped participating teachers with the skills to accomplish these classroom goals through interactive professional development workshops. These workshops were given several times during the school year with these teacher-desired outcomes in the following areas:

Classroom practices: support for motivation; foster engagement with text; sustain reading engagement across the year; energize learning from information text; connect Common Core State Standards to motivation; use research-based approaches

Motivation and engagement practices: setting up partnerships, collaborations, and teams; providing productive choices, large and small; building relevance into reading and writing; encouraging reading values; enabling students to develop their identities; increasing learning in Common Core State Standards

Integrating cognitive strategy instruction includes guidance to: teach higher-order reading skills, improve students' information text comprehension, integrate reading in content domains, provide strategy instruction in subject matters, target digital literacies and traditional textbooks

The objective of CORI is to increase the amount of engaged reading through the use of explicit cognitive and motivational supports or scaffolds. Cognitively, the CORI program stresses the learning of conceptual ideas.

Program specifics

CORI instruction can take place within the domain of any subject matter at any grade level. Lessons are developed for the express purpose of increasing student engagement.  In turn, students’ amount of reading increases, and ultimately, their use of reading strategies, intrinsic motivation, and achievement increase. Texts on a topic are made available to the students, and along with strategy instruction and motivational support, deep understanding of a concept develops. This shows CORI's emphasis on thematic learning.

In keeping with a guided reading model of instruction, lessons were provided for small groups at the struggling reader, on-grade level, and advanced reader levels. Writing and independent reading are part of the CORI program, as is a culminating activity for a unit of study.

Teacher training modules, classroom videos, related research articles and books, and research findings in elementary and middle schools on the CORI website www.corilearning.com provide necessary information to become further informed about this program.

References

Further reading

Books
Guthrie, J. T. (Ed.). (2008). Engaging adolescents in reading. Thousand Oaks, CA: Corwin Press.
Guthrie, J. T., Wigfield, A., & Perencevich, K. C. (Eds.) (2004). Motivating reading comprehension: Concept-Oriented Reading Instruction. Mahwah, NJ: Erlbaum.

Peer-reviewed Journal Articles
Ho, A. N., & Guthrie, J. T. (2013). Patterns of association among multiple motivations and aspects of achievement in reading. Reading Psychology, 34, 1-47.
Guthrie, J. T., Coddington, C. S., & Wigfield, A. (2009). Profiles of motivation for reading among African American and Caucasian students. Journal of Literacy Research, 41, 317–353. Download – for personal use only 
Guthrie, J. T., McRae, A., Coddington, C. S., Klauda, S. L., Wigfield, A., & Barbosa, P. (2009). Impacts of comprehensive reading instruction on diverse outcomes of low-achieving and high-achieving readers. Journal of Learning Disabilities, 42, 195–214.Download – for personal use only
Coddington, C. S., & Guthrie, J. T. (2009). Teacher and student perceptions of boys’ and girls’ reading motivation. Reading Psychology, 30, 225–249.Download – for personal use only 
Taboada, A., Tonks, S. M., Wigfield, A. & Guthrie, J. T. (2009). Effects of motivational and cognitive variables on reading comprehension. Reading and Writing: An Interdisciplinary Journal, 22, 85–106. 
Klauda, S. L. & Guthrie, J. T. (2008). Relationships of three components of reading fluency to reading comprehension. Journal of Educational Psychology, 100, 310–321.Download – for personal use only
Guthrie, J. T., Hoa, L. W., Wigfield, A., Tonks, S. M., Humenick, N. M., & Littles, E. (2007). Reading motivation and reading comprehension growth in the later elementary years. Contemporary Educational Psychology, 32, 282–313.Download – for personal use only
Guthrie, J. T., Hoa, L. W., Wigfield, A., Tonks, S. M., & Perencevich, K. C. (2006). From spark to fire: Can situational reading interest lead to long-term reading motivation? Reading Research and Instruction, 45, 91–117. Download – for personal use only
Lutz, S. L., Guthrie, J. T., & Davis, M. H. (2006). Scaffolding for engagement in learning: An observational study of elementary school reading instruction. Journal of Educational Research, 100, 3-20.Download – for personal use only
Guthrie, J. T., Wigfield, A., Humenick, N. M., Perencevich, K. C., Taboada, A., & Barbosa, P. (2006). Influences of stimulating tasks on reading motivation and comprehension. Journal of Educational Research, 99, 232–245. Download – for personal use only
Guthrie, J. T. (2004). Teaching for literacy engagement. Journal of Literacy Research, 36, 1-30. 
Ozgungor, S., & Guthrie, J. T. (2004). Interactions among elaborative interrogation, knowledge, and interest in the process of constructing knowledge from text. Journal of Educational Psychology, 96, 437–443.Download – for personal use only
Wang, J. H., & Guthrie, J. T. (2004). Modeling the effects of intrinsic motivation, extrinsic motivation, amount of reading, and past reading achievement on text comprehension between U.S. and Chinese students. Reading Research Quarterly, 39, 162–186. 
Wigfield, A., Guthrie, J. T., Tonks, S., & Perencevich, K. C. (2004). Children's motivation for reading: Domain specificity and instructional influences. Journal of Educational Research, 97, 299–309.Download – for personal use only
Guthrie, J. T., & Davis, M. H. (2003). Motivating struggling readers in middle school through an engagement model of classroom practice. Reading & Writing Quarterly, 19, 59–85.Download – for personal use only
Guthrie, J. T., Wigfield, A., & VonSecker, C. (2000) Effects of integrated instruction on motivation and strategy use in reading. Journal of Educational Psychology, 92, 331–341.Download – for personal use only
Guthrie, J. T., Van Meter, P., Hancock, G. R., McCann, A., Anderson, E., & Alao, S. (1998). Does Concept-Oriented Reading Instruction increase strategy-use and conceptual learning from text? Journal of Educational Psychology, 90, 261–278.Download – for personal use only
Swan, E. (1998). Motivational and cognitive influences on conceptual knowledge: The combination of science observation and interesting texts. (Doctoral dissertation). Download – for personal use only
Guthrie, J. T., Van Meter, P. McCann, A. D., & Wigfield, A. (1996). Growth of literacy engagement: Changes in motivations and strategies during Concept-Oriented Reading Instruction. Reading Research Quarterly, 31, 306–332.

Chapters
Guthrie, J. T., Wigfield, A., & You, W. (2012). Instructional contexts for engagement and achievement in reading. In S. Christensen, A. Reschly, & C. Wylie (Eds.), Handbook of research on student engagement (pp. 601–634). New York: Springer Science. 
Guthrie, J. T., & McRae, A. (2011). Reading engagement among African American and European American students. In S. J. Samuels & A. E. Farstrup (Eds.), What research has to say about reading instruction (4th ed.). Newark, DE: International Reading Association.
Swan, E. A., Coddington, C. S., & Guthrie, J. T. (2010). Engaged silent reading. In E. H. Hiebert & D. R. Reutzel (Eds.), Revisiting silent reading (pp. 95–111). Newark, DE: International Reading Association. 
Wigfield, A., & Guthrie, J. T. (2010). The impact of Concept-Oriented Reading Instruction on students’ reading motivation, reading engagement, and reading comprehension. In J. L. Meece & J. S. Eccles (Eds.), Handbook of research on schools, schooling, and human development (pp. 463–477). Mahwah, NJ: Erlbaum.
Guthrie, J. T., & Coddington, C. S. (2009). Reading motivation. In K. Wentzel & A. Wigfield, (Eds.), Handbook of motivation at school (pp. 503–525). New York: Routledge.
Wigfield, A., Tonks. S., & Klauda, S. L. (2009). Expectancy-value theory. In K. R.Wentzel & A. Wigfield (Eds.), Handbook of motivation at school (pp. 55–75). New York: Routledge.
Guthrie, J. T., Rueda, R. S., Gambrell, L. B., & Morrison, D. A. (2009). Roles of engagement, valuing, and identification in reading development of students from diverse backgrounds. In L. Morrow & R. S. *Rueda, (Eds.), Handbook of reading and literacy among students from diverse backgrounds (pp. 195–215). New York: Guilford.
McRae, A., & Guthrie, J. T. (2009). Promoting reasons for reading: Teacher practices that impact motivation. In E. H. Hiebert (Ed.), Reading more, reading better (pp. 55–76). New York: Guilford.
Taboada, A., Guthrie, J. T., & McRae, A. (2008). Building engaging classrooms. In R. Fink & S. J. Samuels (Eds.), Inspiring reading success: Interest and motivation in an age of high-stakes testing (pp. 141–166). Newark, DE: International Reading Association.
Guthrie, J. T., Taboada, A., & Coddington, C. S. (2007). Engagement practices for strategy learning in Concept-Oriented Reading Instruction. In D. S. McNamara (Ed.), Reading comprehension strategies: Theory, interventions, and technologies (pp. 241–266). Mahwah, NJ: Erlbaum.
Guthrie, J. T. & Wigfield, A. (2005). Roles of motivation and engagement in reading comprehension assessment. In S. Paris, & S. Stahl (Eds.), Children's Reading Comprehension and Assessment (pp. 187–213). Mahwah: NJ: Erlbaum.
Guthrie, J. T. & Humenick, N. M. (2004) Motivating students to read: Evidence for classroom practices that increase reading motivation and achievement. In. P. McCardle & V. Chhabra (Eds.), The voice of evidence in reading research (pp. 329–354). Baltimore: Brookes.
Guthrie, J. T. (2003). Concept-Oriented Reading Instruction: Practices of Teaching Reading for Understanding. In C. Snow & A. Sweet (Eds.), Reading for Understanding: Implications of RAND Report for Education (pp. 115–140). New York: Guilford.

Further reading

Guthrie, J. T., & Klauda, S. L. (2012). Making textbook reading meaningful. Educational Leadership, 69, 64–68. 
Pearson, P. D., Moje, E., & Greenleaf, C. (2011). Literacy and science: Each in the service of the other. Science, 328, 459–463.
Guthrie, J. T., & Anderson, E. (1999). Engagement in reading: Processes of motivated, strategic, knowledgeable, social readers. In J. T. Guthrie & D. E. Alvermann (Eds.), Engaged reading: Processes, practices, and policy implications (pp. 17–45). New York: Teachers College Press.
Wigfield, A. (1997). Children's motivations for reading and reading engagement. In J. T. Guthrie & A. Wigfield (Eds.), Reading engagement: Motivating readers through integrated instruction (pp. 14–33). Newark, DE: International Reading Association.

Elementary Grades

Bitter, C., O’Day, J., Gubbins, P., & Socias, M. (2009). What works to improve student literacy achievement? An examination of instructional practices in a balanced literacy approach. Journal of Education for Students Placed at Risk, 14(1), 17–44.
Clark, A-M., Anderson, R. C., Kuo, L., Kim, I., Archodidou, A., & Nguyen-Jahiel, K. (2003). Collaborative reasoning: Expanding ways for children to talk and think in school. Educational Psychology Review, 15(2), 181–198.
Duke, N. K. (2000). 3.6 minutes per day: The scarcity of informational texts in first grade. Reading Research Quarterly, 35(2), 202–224. 
Duke, N. K., & Pearson, P. D. (2002). Effective practices for developing reading comprehension. In A. E. Farstup & S. J. Samuels (Eds.), What research has to say about reading instruction (3rd ed., pp. 205–242). Newark, DE: International Reading Association.
Duke, N. K., Martineau, J. A., Frank, K. A., & Bennett-Armistead, V. S. (2009). The impact of including more informational text in first grade classrooms. Unpublished. 
Guthrie, J. T., & McCann, A. D. (1998). Characteristics of classrooms that promote motivations and strategies for learning. In J. T. Guthrie & A. Wigfield (Eds.), Reading engagement: Motivating readers through integrated instruction (2nd ed., pp. 128– 148). Newark, DE: International Reading Association. 
Guthrie, J. T., Anderson, E., Alao, S., & Rinehart, J. (1999). Influences of concept-oriented reading instruction on strategy use and conceptual learning from text. Elementary School Journal, 99(4), 343–366.
Guthrie, J. T., Wigfield, A., Barbosa, P., Perencevich, K. C., Taboada, A., Davis, M. H., et al. (2004). Increasing reading comprehension and engagement through concept-oriented reading instruction. Journal of Educational Psychology, 96(3), 403–423. 
Guthrie, J. T., Wigfield, A., Humenick, N. M., Perencevich, K. C., Taboada, A., & Barbosa, P. (2006). Influences of stimulating tasks on reading motivation and comprehension. The Journal of Educational Research, 99(4), 232–245.
Hansen, J. (1981). The effects of inference training and practice on young children's reading comprehension. Reading Research Quarterly, 16(3), 391–417.
Linnenbrink, L. A., & Pintrich, P. R. (2003). The role of self-efficacy beliefs in student engagement and learning in the classroom. Reading & Writing Quarterly, 19, 119–137.
National Reading Panel. (2000). Teaching children to read: An evidence-based assessment of the scientific research literature on reading and its implications for reading instruction (NIH Publication No. 00-4769). Washington, DC: National Institute of Child Health and Human Development.
Perfetti, C. A., Landi, N., & Oakhill, J. (2005). The acquisition of reading comprehension skill. In M. J. Snowling & C. Hulme (Eds.), The science of reading: A handbook (pp. 227–247). Oxford: Blackwell. 
Pressley, M., Burkell, J., Cariglia-Bull, T., Lysynchuk, L., McGoldrick, J. A., Shneider, B., et al. (1990). Cognitive strategy instruction that really improves children's academic performance. Cambridge, MA: Brookline Books. 
Pressley, M., Dolezal, S. E., Raphael, L. M., Mohan, L., Roehrig, A. D., & Bogner, K. (2003). Motivating primary-grade students. New York: Guilford Press.
Reutzel, D. R., Smith, J. A., & Fawson, P. C. (2005). An evaluation of two approaches for teaching reading comprehension strategies in the primary years using science information texts. Early Childhood Research Quarterly, 20, 276–305.
Skinner, E. A., & Belmont, M. J. (1993). Motivation in the classroom: Reciprocal effects of teacher behavior and student engagement c across the school year. Journal of Educational Psychology, 85, 571–581.
Slavin, R. E.(1990). Cooperative learning: Theory, research, & practice. Englewood, NJ: Prentice Hall.
Williams, J. P., Staggord, K. B., Lauer, K. D., Hall, K. M., & Pollini, S. (2009). Embedding reading comprehension training in content-area instruction. Journal of Educational Psychology, 101(1), 1–20.

Middle School and Above

Adler, M., & Rougle, E. (2005). Building literacy through classroom discussion: Research-based strategies for developing critical readers and thoughtful writers in middle school. New York: Scholastic.
Applebee, A. N., Langer, J. A., Nystrand, M., & Gamoran, A. (2003). Discussion-based approaches to developing understand¬ing: Classroom instruction and student performance in middle and high school English. American Educational Research Journal, 40(3), 685–730.
Artley, S. (1944). A study of certain re¬lationships existing between general reading comprehension and reading comprehension in a specific subject matter area. Journal of Educational Re¬search, 37, 464–73.
Biancarosa, C., & Snow, C. E. (2006). Reading next: A vision for action and research in middle and high school literacy: A report to Carnegie Corporation of New York (2nd ed.). Washington, DC: Alliance for Excellent Education.
Biancarosa, G., & Snow, C. E. (2004). Reading next: A vision for action and research in middle and high school literacy: A report to Carnegie Corporation of New York. Washington, DC: Alliance for Excellent Education.
Guthrie, J. T., & Humenick, N. M. (2004). Motivating students to read: Evidence for classroom practices that increase reading motivation and achievement. In P. McCardle & V. Chhabra (Eds.), The voice of evidence in reading research (pp. 329–54). Baltimore, MD: Paul H. Brookes Publishing.
Guthrie, J. T., & McCann, A. D. (1997). Characteristics of classrooms that promote motivations and strategies for learning. In J. T. Guthrie & A. Wigfield (Eds.), Reading engagement: Motivating readers through integrated instruction (pp. 128–48). Newark, DE: International Reading Association.
Guthrie, J. T., Anderson, E., Alao, S., & Rinehart, J. (1999). Influences of Concept-Oriented Reading Instruction on strategy use and conceptual learning from text. Elementary School Journal, 99(4), 343–66.
Guthrie, J. T., Wigfield, A., & VonSecker, C. (2000). Effects of integrated instruction on motivation and strategy use in read¬ing. Journal of Educational Psychology, 92(2), 331–41.
Heller, R., & Greenleaf, C. L. (2007). Literacy instruction in the content areas: Getting to the core of middle and high school improvement. Washington, DC: Alliance for Excellent Education.
Kamil, M. L. (2003). Adolescents and literacy: Reading for the 21st century. Washington DC: Alliance for Excellent Education.
Kingery, E. (2000). Teaching metacognitive strategies to enhance higher level thinking in adolescents. In P. E. Linder, E. G. Sturtevant, W. M. Linek, & J. R. Dugan (Eds.), Literacy at a new horizon: The twenty-secondary yearbook. (pp. 74–85) Commerce, TX: College Reading Association. 
Klingner, J. K., Vaughn, S., & Schumm, J. S. (1998). Collaborative strategic reading during social studies in heterogeneous fourth-grade classrooms. Elementary School Journal, 99(1), 3–22.
Koury, K. A. (1996). The impact of pre¬teaching science content vocabulary using integrated media for knowledge acquisition in a collaborative class¬room. Journal of Computing in Child¬hood Education, 7(3–4), 179–97.
Langer, J. A. (2001). Beating the odds: Teaching middle and high school students to read and write well. American Educational Research Journal, 38(4), 837–80. 
Lee, J., Griggs, W. S., & Donahue, P. L. (2007). Nation's report card: Reading (NCES 2007–496). Washington, DC: U.S. Department of Education, Institute of Education Sciences, National Center for Education Statistics.
Scammacca, N., Roberts, G., Vaughn, S., Edmonds, M., Wexler, J., Reutebuch, C. K., & Torgesen, J. K. (2007). Interventions for adolescent struggling readers: A meta-analysis with implications for practice. Portsmouth, NH: RMC Research Corporation, Center on Instruction.
Schunk, D. H. (2003). Self-efficacy for read¬ing and writing: Influence of modeling, goal setting, and self-evaluation. Reading & Writing Quarterly, 19(2), 159–72.
Zwiers, J. (2004). Building reading compre¬hension habits in grades 6–12: A toolkit of classroom activities. Newark, DE: International Reading Association.

Reading (process)
Learning to read